Jorge Iván Carrasco Monsalves (born 3 November 1960) is a Chilean former footballer who played as a defender. He made six appearances for the Chile national team in 1989. He was also part of Chile's squad for the 1989 Copa América tournament.

References

External links
 

1960 births
Living people
Chilean footballers
Association football defenders
Chile international footballers
C.D. Arturo Fernández Vial footballers
Cobreloa footballers
C.D. Huachipato footballers
Deportes Concepción (Chile) footballers
Place of birth missing (living people)